Alioune "Badou" Ndour (born 21 October 1997) is a Senegalese football midfielder who plays for Zulte Waregem.

Career statistics

Club

References

1997 births
Living people
Footballers from Dakar
Senegalese footballers
Khor Fakkan Sports Club players
Florø SK players
Sogndal Fotball players
FK Haugesund players
Norwegian First Division players
Eliteserien players
Association football midfielders
Senegalese expatriate footballers
Expatriate footballers in the United Arab Emirates
Senegalese expatriate sportspeople in the United Arab Emirates
Expatriate footballers in Norway
Senegalese expatriate sportspeople in Norway